Parlascio is a village in Tuscany, central Italy, administratively a frazione of the comune of Casciana Terme Lari, province of Pisa. At the time of the 2001 census its population was 149.

Parlascio is about 39 km from Pisa and 7 km from Lari.

References 

Frazioni of the Province of Pisa